Christine Moore may refer to:

 Christine Moore (director), American television director
 Christine Moore (politician) (born 1983), Canadian politician
 Christine Moore, former co-owner of the now-defunct Moore's Delicatessen
 Christine Palamidessi Moore, Italian-American writer and novelist

See also
 Chris More (Christine More), Canadian curler
 Christina Moore, American actress